Susan E. Hanson (born March 31, 1943) is an American geographer. She is a Distinguished University Professor Emerita in the Graduate School of Geography at Clark University. Her research has focused on gender and work, travel patterns, and feminist scholarly approaches.

Career
Hanson studied as an undergraduate at Middlebury College between 1960 and 1964, subsequently working with the Peace Corps in Kenya. She studied for a PhD at Northwestern University between 1967 and 1973. Hanson was awarded tenure at the University at Buffalo, where she worked in the geography and sociology departments between 1972 and 1980. She moved to Clark in 1981. She is a past president of the American Association of Geographers (then known as the Association of American Geographers) and has been the editor of four geography journals: Urban Geography, Economic Geography, the Annals of the Association of American Geographers, and The Professional Geographer.

Victoria Lawson has argued that Hanson's career "is an empowering example of a collage of woven-together life experiences, substantive research interests, feminist values and progressive professional practices". In 2010, Marianna Pavlovskaya wrote that Hanson "is one of the most accomplished academics in U.S. geography today".

Honors and awards
Hanson was awarded a Guggenheim Fellowship in 1989, was made a fellow of the American Association for the Advancement of Science in 1991, and in 1999 received the Van Cleef Memorial Medal from the American Geographical Society, a medal conferred on scholars in the field of urban geography. In 2000, she became the first female geographer to be elected to both the National Academy of Sciences and the American Academy of Arts and Sciences.

At the 2008 Association of American Geographers conference, three panels were dedicated to honouring her contribution to the discipline, and five of the papers presented were subsequently published as a themed section of an issue of Gender, Place & Culture: A Journal of Feminist Geography. She was awarded the 2015 Stanley Brunn Award for Creativity in Geography by the American Association of Geographers, which also awarded her Lifetime Achievement Honors in 2003.

She is the chair of the Transportation Research Board's (TRB) Division Committee, representing TRB as an ex officio member on the NRC Governing Board.

Selected publications

Books

Articles

References

External links
Clark University profile page

American geographers
Clark University faculty
Women geographers
1943 births
Fellows of the American Academy of Arts and Sciences
Fellows of the American Association for the Advancement of Science
Members of the United States National Academy of Sciences
Presidents of the American Association of Geographers
Living people
Urban geographers
University at Buffalo faculty